Iowa State University's College of Liberal Arts and Sciences (LAS) was established in 1959, as the College of Sciences and Humanities, and is the most academically diverse college at Iowa State University.  The college consists of 22 academic departments and one school, the Greenlee School of Journalism and Communication.

History 

Officially formed in 1959, the College of Liberal Arts and Sciences got its current name in 1990 and can trace its history back to 1898, when liberal arts and sciences were a part of the school's Division of Science and Philosophy. Since the school's beginning, Iowa State's founders had intended to produce well-rounded students.

Academics 

With 53 programs in 22 departments and one school, Liberal Arts and Sciences is the most academically diverse college at Iowa State University.

Facilities 

Although the college utilizes many buildings on campus to house the many different college entities, the College of Liberal Arts and Sciences administration is housed in Carrie Chapman Catt Hall, which it shares with the Carrie Chapman Catt Center for Women and Politics and the Department of Philosophy and Religious Studies.

Catt Hall 

Named for Carrie Chapman Catt, an American women's rights activist and founder of the League of Women Voters. She graduated from Iowa State in 1880 at the top of her class. The building has been known by a variety of names over its history. It was originally known as Agriculture Hall when it was built in 1893, and was later named Agricultural Engineering Building, then Botany Hall, then Old Botany Hall, after the botany department moved to Bessey Hall. The building's interior was gutted and renovated in 1992, at which point it was given its current name and purpose as the administrative office for the College of Liberal Arts and Sciences.

Student involvement 
The college's affiliated student organizations are governed by the Liberal Arts and Sciences Student Council, consisting of a student representative from each academic department and each affiliated student organization.

References

External links 
Iowa State LAS College

Liberal Arts and Sciences
1898 establishments in Iowa